The District Court of Maryland for Talbot County District Courthouse is located in  Easton, Maryland.  Jurisdiction of the District Court includes most landlord- tenant cases, small claims for amounts up to $5,000, replevin
actions, motor vehicle violations, misdemeanors, certain felonies, and peace and protective orde with one judge, Hugh Adkins, presiding.

References

County courthouses in Maryland
Buildings and structures in Talbot County, Maryland
Easton, Maryland
Courthouses in Maryland